The Cape Verdean ambassador in Washington, D. C. is the official representative of the Government in Praia to the Government of the United States.

List of representatives

Cape Verde–United States relations

References 

 
United States
Cape Verde